Serdar Bozkurt (born 28 April 1977) is a Turkish football manager. He is the manager of Tarsus İdman Yurdu.

References

1977 births
Living people
Turkish football managers
Sarıyer S.K. managers
Şanlıurfaspor managers
Sakaryaspor managers